Merlene Frazer (born 27 December 1973, Trelawny, Jamaica) is a retired female track and field sprinter from Jamaica who specialized in the 200 metres. In the 4 x 100 metres relay, she won a World Championship gold medal in 1991 and an Olympic silver medal in 2000. On both occasions, she ran in the preliminary rounds but not the final. Her biggest individual success was winning a World Championship bronze medal at 200 metres in 1997.

As part of the Jamaican 4 x 100 relay squad in 1991, she is the youngest World Champion ever.

Achievements

<small>Notes:
 ^ At both the 1991 World Championships and the 2000 Olympic Games, Frazer ran in the preliminary rounds of the 4 × 100 m relay but not in the final.
 (#) Indicates overall position in qualifying heats (h) or semifinals (sf).

Personal bests
100 metres - 11.20 s (1995)
200 metres - 22.18 s (1999)
400 metres - 51.18 s (1996)

References

External links
 
 

1973 births
Living people
Jamaican female sprinters
Athletes (track and field) at the 1991 Pan American Games
Athletes (track and field) at the 1994 Commonwealth Games
Athletes (track and field) at the 1996 Summer Olympics
Athletes (track and field) at the 2000 Summer Olympics
Olympic athletes of Jamaica
Olympic silver medalists for Jamaica
People from Trelawny Parish
World Athletics Championships medalists
Junior college women's track and field athletes in the United States
Medalists at the 2000 Summer Olympics
Olympic silver medalists in athletics (track and field)
Pan American Games medalists in athletics (track and field)
Pan American Games gold medalists for Jamaica
Pan American Games bronze medalists for Jamaica
Goodwill Games medalists in athletics
World Athletics Championships winners
Competitors at the 2001 Goodwill Games
Medalists at the 1991 Pan American Games
Commonwealth Games competitors for Jamaica
Olympic female sprinters
20th-century Jamaican women
21st-century Jamaican women